The Battle for the Bones is a sports rivalry between the University of Alabama at Birmingham Blazers and the University of Memphis Tigers. The two NCAA Division I schools compete in various sports, with men's basketball and college football in particular being prominent.

The rivalry began in 1984, when the two schools first met in men's basketball. Memphis currently leads the series at 39–11. The football rivalry began in 1997. Since 2006 it has been known as the "Battle for the Bones" due to its trophy, a bronze rack of ribs.

The future of the rivalry was unclear as Memphis joined the American Athletic Conference in 2013 during the 2010–2013 Big East Conference realignment. However, the series continued semi-regularly in basketball after the Tigers departure from Conference USA. 
However, in October 2021, the UAB Blazers accepted an invitation to join the American Athletic Conference, thus renewing the rivalry and trophy as a regular conference match-ups. It is presumed that UAB will move to the league no later than the 2023 season.

Men's basketball

The UAB–Memphis men's basketball rivalry has the longest history of all their sports, and tends to be the most intense and heated affair. The first matchup between the Memphis Tigers and UAB Blazers was played in 1984, when the teams first met in basketball. The two teams have played at least twice a year since 1992, when they both moved to the Great Midwest Conference and later to Conference USA.

Head coach Gene Bartow was influential in both programs. He coached Memphis (then Memphis State) from 1970 to 1974, and in 1978 he became the first head coach of UAB's new program, which he led until 1996. His long tenure and success with the Blazers has led to him being known as the "Father of UAB Athletics".

Notable Games
March 17, 1985†: In only the second meeting between two schools, 2nd-seed Memphis took on 7th-seed UAB in the Second round of the 1985 NCAA Division I men's basketball tournament. The Blazers, led by former Memphis coach Gene Bartow in their fifth consecutive NCAA appearance, played the Tigers closely in a game that had to go into overtime. Despite the best effort from UAB, Memphis would win 67–66 and go onto the Final Four.

March 10, 2006: After splitting the regular season series, the Blazers and Tigers met in the 2006 Conference USA men's basketball tournament final hosted at FedExForum. The John Calipari lead Tigers ultimately would win the game 57–46, clinching the first Conference USA title for Memphis.

February 16, 2008†: The #1-ranked Memphis Tigers were nearly upset before pulling out a 79–78 win. As the Tigers were down by 8 points with 2 minutes left, they went on a 9–1 run. After the conclusion of the game, an altercation between Memphis players and UAB fans occurred. Ultimately, people in the stands began booing the Memphis players off the court and throwing drinks and shakers at them as the players were escorted off the court by local police officers.

† Denotes game vacated by Memphis

Game results
Rankings are from the AP Poll (1936–present)

Notes

A NCAA second round
B 1992 Great Midwest Conference men's basketball tournament
C 1994 Great Midwest Conference men's basketball tournament
D 2006 Conference USA men's basketball tournament

Football

The Blazers and Tigers began competing in football after the Blazers football team joined Division I in 1997. The series has been played nearly every year since, and is led by UAB with a win–loss record of 10 to 5. In 2006, the schools introduced a trophy, a 100-pound bronze rack of ribs alluding to the two cities' reputation for barbecue, and dubbed the game the "Battle for the Bones". In keeping with the theme, a fan barbecue competition accompanies the game.

Game results
Rankings are from the AP Poll (1936–present)

References

Further reading 

 
 

College football rivalries in the United States
College basketball rivalries in the United States
Memphis Tigers
UAB Blazers